Fulvoclysia pallorana is a species of moth of the family Tortricidae. It is found in the Caucasus, Armenia and Asia Minor.

References

Moths described in 1864
Cochylini